Independentism may refer to one of the following concepts:

 the church system of the Independents in English church history, see Independent (religion)
 advocacy of the independence of a certain region or territory, usually by secession from a larger political unit
 sometimes used interchangeably with separatism